Batrachedra verax is a species of moth in the family Batrachedridae. It was first described by Edward Meyrick in 1917 and is found in Sri Lanka.

References

Natural History Museum Lepidoptera generic names catalog

Batrachedridae
Moths of Sri Lanka
Moths described in 1917
Taxa named by Edward Meyrick